Antônio Carlos is a Brazilian municipality located in the state of Minas Gerais. Its population  was 11,459 people living in an area of 530 km².  The elevation is 1,058 meters.  The city belongs to the mesoregion of Campo das Vertentes and to the microregion of Barbacena.  The important regional center of Barbacena lies 13 km. to the north and is connected by highway MG-135.  Antônio Carlos is on the railroad line that connects with Juíz de Fora.

See also
 List of municipalities in Minas Gerais

References

Municipalities in Minas Gerais